An online learning community is a public or private destination on the Internet that addresses its members' learning needs by facilitating peer-to-peer learning. Through social networking and computer-mediated communication, or the use of datagogies while people work as a community to achieve a shared learning objective. The community owner may propose learning objectives or may arise out of discussions between participants that reflect personal interests.  In an online learning community, people share knowledge via textual discussion (synchronous or asynchronous), audio, video, or other Internet-supported media.  Blogs blend personal journaling with social networking to create environments with opportunities for reflection.

According to Etienne Wenger, online learning communities are environments conducive to communities of practice.

Categories
Types of online learning communities include e-learning communities (groups interact and connect solely via technology) and blended learning communities (groups utilize face-to-face meetings as well as online meetings). Based on Riel and Polin (2004), intentional online learning communities may be categorized as knowledge-based, practice-based, and task-based. Online learning communities may focus on personal aspects, process, or technology. They may use technology and tools in many categories:
 synchronous (such as instant messaging or language exchange websites and mobile applications
 asynchronous (such as message boards and Internet forums)
 blogs
 course management
 collaborative (such as wikis)
 social networking
 social learning
 online university
 skills and language exchange platforms

See also
Community language learning
Community of practice
Massive open online course
Virtual education
University of the People

References

Bibliography
 

 

Distance education
Social networks
Peer learning